Kelly Wayne Stouffer (born July 6, 1964) is a former American football quarterback in the National Football League (NFL). He spent most of his career with the Seattle Seahawks from 1988–1992.

Early years
Born in Scottsbluff, Nebraska, Stouffer graduated from Rushville High School in northwestern Nebraska and played college football at Colorado State University in Fort Collins.

NFL career
At the conclusion of Stouffer's collegiate career, he achieved notoriety when, after being selected by the St. Louis Cardinals in the first round (sixth overall) of the 1987 NFL Draft, he sat out what would have been his rookie year due to an inability to agree on a contract.

The following April, the Cardinals traded Stouffer's rights to the Seattle Seahawks for three draft picks, who listed Stouffer as third-string behind starter Dave Krieg and veteran backup Jeff Kemp in 1988. Krieg was sidelined in the third game with a separated shoulder, and the following week Kemp was ineffective and was benched in favor of Stouffer by halftime. Stouffer endeared himself to Seattle fans in one play where, after stumbling and having his nose broken when it collided with a teammate's elbow, he threw for a long gain resulting in a touchdown against the San Francisco 49ers. Stouffer filled in for nearly two months, until Krieg returned to the lineup in mid-November; Seattle won the division (AFC West) with a 9–7 record, but lost in the divisional round of the AFC playoffs to top-seeded Cincinnati. Stouffer seemed to regress in the eyes of Seahawk coaches over the next couple of years, and fell back to third string, behind Kemp.

Following the 1991 season, head coach Chuck Knox was replaced by Tom Flores and Krieg was let go; Stouffer won the starting job in 1992, ahead of Dan McGwire and Stan Gelbaugh. Stouffer was injured in week 5, as the Seahawks started the season 1–4. After McGwire was quickly injured, journeyman Gelbaugh became the starter, yielding the job to Stouffer once Stouffer recovered. Stouffer, who seemed to have been showing a return to his rookie form just before his injury, was never the same, however, and Gelbaugh quickly became the established starter.

The following season, Stouffer was released; he was signed by the Miami Dolphins to a free agent contract in April 1994 but was released prior to the regular season. Two years later, Stouffer was signed by the Carolina Panthers to a free agent contract in March 1996 but was released prior to the regular season.

After football
In 2000, Stouffer finished his B.S. degree in biology from the Colorado State University College of Agricultural Sciences and became the first undergraduate to earn that degree via the college's distance learning program.

Stouffer is a television color analyst for college football games on ESPN/ABC, and was formerly with the NFL on FOX, Versus, MountainWest Sports Network and Minnesota Vikings pre-season games.

References

External links
 

1964 births
Living people
American football quarterbacks
Carolina Panthers players
College football announcers
Colorado State Rams football players
National Football League announcers
Seattle Seahawks players
People from Scottsbluff, Nebraska
People from Sheridan County, Nebraska
Players of American football from Nebraska